E.J. Lavino and Company No. 3 is an inoperable  steam locomotive preserved at Steamtown National Historic Site. It was built by the American Locomotive Company in 1927 as Poland Springs Railroad No. 2. No record exists that the locomotive was ever delivered to Poland Springs. In any case, it is known to have been sold to the E.J. Lavino Steel Company of Sheridan, Pennsylvania sometime by 1949. In 1966, the locomotive was donated to F. Nelson Blount and Steamtown, U.S.A. in Bellows Falls, Vermont in 1966. A sister , E.J. Lavino and Company 10, is at the Pacific Southwest Railway Museum.
.

References 

ALCO locomotives
0-6-0ST locomotives
Individual locomotives of the United States
Standard gauge locomotives of the United States
Preserved steam locomotives of Pennsylvania